Athabasca-Sturgeon-Redwater was a provincial electoral district in Alberta mandated to return a single member to the Legislative Assembly of Alberta using first-past-the-post balloting from 2012 to 2019.

History
The electoral district was created in the 2010 electoral boundary re-distribution from the electoral old district of Athabasca-Redwater. The electoral district boundaries were updated to align the district to current municipal boundaries along the sparsely populated north and western boundaries.

The Athabasca-Sturgeon electoral district was dissolved in the 2017 electoral boundary re-distribution, and portions of the district would incorporate the Athabasca-Barrhead-Westlock and Morinville-St. Albert electoral districts for the 2019 Alberta general election.

Boundary history

Representation history

The predecessor district Athabasca-Redwater that existed from 2004 to 2012. Its antecedents had returned Progressive Conservative candidates since the 1970s while old Redwater returned Liberal candidates until 1997. The current incumbent is Progressive Conservative MLA Jeff Johnson who won his first term in office in the 2008 election with a landslide majority.

Legislature results

2012 general election

2015 general election

Senate nominee results

2012 Senate nominee election district results

Student vote results

2012 election

See also
List of Alberta provincial electoral districts

References

External links
Elections Alberta
The Legislative Assembly of Alberta

Alberta provincial electoral districts
Athabasca, Alberta